Dubius is a genus of flies in the family Dolichopodidae, with seven species distributed in southern China and another five in the Neotropical realm. The genus name is from the Latin word , referring to the variance of frons. The genus was first established by Wei Lian-Meng in 2012, including a group of species from the Neotropical realm previously placed in Chrysotus, as well as five newly described species from China. According to some researchers, all of the Neotropical species should be kept in Chrysotus, as their transfer to Dubius was unwarranted.

Species
Chinese species:
 Dubius autumnalus Wei, 2012
 Dubius curtus Wei, 2012
 Dubius flavipedus Liu, Wang & Yang, 2015
 Dubius frontus Wei, 2012
 Dubius hongyaensis Wei, 2012
 Dubius succurtus Wei, 2012
 Dubius yunnanensis Liu, Wang & Yang, 2015

Neotropical species (now transferred back to Chrysotus):
 Dubius angustifrons (Robinson, 1975)
 Dubius maculatus (Parent, 1930)
 Dubius robustus (Robinson, 1975)
 Dubius spectabilis (Loew, 1861)
 Dubius wirthi (Robinson, 1975)

References 

Dolichopodidae genera
Diaphorinae